Arizona Days is a 1928 American silent Western film directed by J. P. McGowan, who also portrayed the protagonist.

Cast 
 Bob Custer as Chuck Drexel 
 Peggy Montgomery as Dolly Martin 
 John Lowell as John Martin
 J. P. McGowan as Ed Hicks
 Mack V. Wright as Black Bailey 
 Jack Ponder as Reginald Van Wiley

External links 

 
 
 Arizona Days at Odysee

1928 films
1928 Western (genre) films
1920s English-language films
American black-and-white films
Silent American Western (genre) films
Films directed by J. P. McGowan
1920s American films